Umatilla Russet is a moderately late maturing variety of potato especially suitable for frozen french fries processing. It was jointly released by the Agricultural Experiment Station of Oregon, Idaho, and Washington and the U.S. Department of Agriculture in 1998. 'Umatilla Russet' has been equal to or better than Russet Burbank in fry color in Oregon and regional trials. The potato was named by the state of Oregon after the Umatilla tribe, from which the city of Umatilla also takes its name.

Characteristics

Botanical
 Tuber skin is tan color and russety-like
 Tubers are long with a tendency for tapered apical ends
 Flesh is slightly creamy
 Leaves are dark green, medium pubescence
 Few (up to 7) flowers per plant
 Flowers are light purple with a yellow-orange center cone

Agricultural

 Less susceptible to Verticillium wilt
 Less susceptible to net necrosis
 Resistant to Potato virus X (PVX)
 Expresses foliar symptoms of Potato virus Y (PVY)
 Less susceptible to tuber infection and decay caused by Phytophthora infestans 
 More susceptible to blackspot and shutter bruise
 Less susceptible to hollow heart,  brown center, growth cracks and  sugar ends

References 

Potato cultivars